Paula Preradović (12 October 1887 – 25 May 1951), known professionally as Paula von Preradović or by her married name as Paula Molden, was an Austrian writer and poet.

She was the granddaughter of the poet, writer and military general Petar Preradović. Paula Preradović was born in Vienna, but her family moved to Pula, Istria, in 1889. Later she lived in Copenhagen and again in Vienna. She was married to the journalist, diplomat and founder of the Austrian newspaper Die Presse, Ernst Molden, and had two sons, the publicist and federalist Otto Molden (1918–2002), and the journalist  (1924–2014).

She composed the lyrics for the national anthem of Austria, "Land der Berge, Land am Strome", in 1947.

Preradović died in Vienna in 1951 and is buried at the Zentralfriedhof.

Works 
Poetry
 Dalmatinische Sonette, 1933
 Lob Gottes im Gebirge, 1936
 Ritter, Tod und Teufel, 1946

Prose
 Pave und Pero, 1940
 Königslegende, 1950
 Die Versuchung des Columba, 1951
 Wiener Chronik, 1945, her diary which was published only in 1995

References

External links

1887 births
1951 deaths
20th-century Austrian poets
Austrian women poets
National anthem writers
Austro-Hungarian writers
People from Landstraße
Burials at the Vienna Central Cemetery
20th-century Austrian women writers
Austrian people of Croatian descent
Austrian people of Serbian descent